Putty Hill is a 2010 American independent drama film directed by Matthew Porterfield, and starring Sky Ferreira, Zoe Vance, and James Siebor. The plot focuses on friends and family who gather to remember a young man in the aftermath of his death and attempt to reconstruct his last days.

Plot
The film revolves around a community of friends and family as they cope with the untimely death of a young man named Cory in Baltimore, Maryland. Throughout the film the characters engage one on one with the camera discussing their relationship to Cory and their reactions to his death.

Cast
Sky Ferreira as Jenny, Cory's Cousin; Spike's Daughter.
Zoe Vance as Zoe, Cory's Older Sister.
James Siebor as James, Cory's Brother.
Dustin Ray as Dustin, Cory's Best Friend.
Charles Sauers as Spike, Cory's Uncle; Jenny's Father; Cathy's Brother.
Cathy Evans as Cathy, Mother of Cory, Zoe, James and Marina; Spike's Sister.
Virginia Heath as Virginia, Cathy and Spike's Mom.
Cody as Cody, Dustin's Brother.
Casey Weibust as Casey, Zoe's Best Friend.
Drew Harris as Geoff, Cory's Neighbor, Ashley's Brother.
Marina Siebor as Marina, Cory's Younger Sister.
Jimee Buchanon as Jimee, Cory's Friend; Ashley's Neighbor; Mary's Boyfriend.
Mary Pozoulakis as Mary, Cory's Friend; Jimee's Girlfriend. 
Aurora Corey as Aurora, Jenny's Childhood Best Friend.
Liz O'Brien as Liz, Aurora's Friend.
Ashley Ocfemia as Ashley, Aurora's Friend; Geoff's Sister.
Ian Burke as Ian, Cody's Friend.
Joseph Mooney as Joe, A Friend of the Family.
Carol Ray as Carol, Cody and Dustin's Mom.
India Streeter as India, Cody's Girlfriend.
Alex Herbskerman as Alex, Zoe's Friend.
Lucie Stahl as Lucie, Zoe's Friend.
Julia Arredondo as Julia, Zoe's Friend.

Filming
Filming took place in and around Baltimore, Maryland. The film is noted for utilizing mainly nonprofessional actors who play themselves in a fictional story. Much of the dialogue was created through conversations Matthew Porterfield had with the actors prior to filming. The director names mainly European directors as influences, such as Pedro Costa and Robert Bresson.

Reception
Putty Hill was premiered at the Berlin Film Festival. Roger Ebert reviewed the film giving it 4 out of 4 stars. The film was designated a New York Times Critic's Pick as well. The film had its Baltimore premiere within Maryland Film Festival to two sold-out screenings in May, 2010. It was acquired for U.S. distribution by The Cinema Guild.

Putty Hill currently holds a rating of "75%" based on 28 reviews from critics.

References

External links
 
 
 
 Matthew Porterfield - Filmmaker Magazine
  N1FR Review

2010 films
2010 drama films
American independent films
Films set in Baltimore
Films shot in Baltimore
American drama films
2010 independent films
2010s English-language films
2010s American films